Au Maroc (1890; "In Morocco") is a travel memoir by Pierre Loti about a month-long journey by horseback in Morocco through Tangier, Fez and Mekinez. The initial trip from Tangier to Fez was in the company of a French embassy, after which Loti continued on by himself dressed in native clothing. Au Maroc was Loti's first pure travel literature.

The book has been influential. Matisse, before coming to Morocco, studied the country by reading Loti's book. Edith Wharton’s In Morocco (1920) found its "strongest influence" in Loti's account.

Notes

External links
Sources
Morocco. Translated by William Peter Baines. Philadelphia, D. McKay. 1914. From Internet Archive.
 . Link is to Gallica. Internet Archive: edition published in 1890, edition published in 1900.

Commentary
"The Orient of Pierre Loti", by Arthur Clark, July/August 1992 print edition of Saudi Aramco World. Background on the author and the book.

1890 non-fiction books
Books by Pierre Loti
French travel books
French memoirs
Books about Morocco